Bug-out may refer to the following
"Bug Out", an episode of M*A*S*H
Bug-out bag
Bug-out location

See also
Bughouse (disambiguation)